Events in the year 1997 in Brazil.

Incumbents

Federal government
 President: Fernando Henrique Cardoso
 Vice President: Marco Maciel

Governors 
 Acre: Orleir Messias Cameli 
 Alagoas: Divaldo Suruagy (till 17 July); Manoel Gomes de Barros (Mano) (from 17 July)
 Amapa: João Capiberibe
 Amazonas: Amazonino Mendes
 Bahia: Paulo Souto
 Ceará: Tasso Jereissati 
 Espírito Santo: Vitor Buaiz 
 Goiás: Maguito Vilela
 Maranhão: Roseana Sarney
 Mato Grosso: Dante de Oliveira
 Mato Grosso do Sul: Wilson Barbosa Martins
 Minas Gerais: Eduardo Brandão Azeredo 
 Pará: Almir Gabriel 
 Paraíba: José Maranhão 
 Paraná: Jaime Lerner 
 Pernambuco: Miguel Arraes 
 Piauí: Mão Santa
 Rio de Janeiro: Marcello Alencar
 Rio Grande do Norte: Garibaldi Alves Filho 
 Rio Grande do Sul: Antônio Britto 
 Rondônia: Valdir Raupp de Mattos 
 Roraima: Neudo Ribeiro Campos 
 Santa Catarina: Paulo Afonso Vieira 
 São Paulo: Mário Covas 
 Sergipe: Albano Franco 
 Tocantins: José Wilson Siqueira Campos

Vice governors
 Acre: Labib Murad 
 Alagoas: Manuel Gomes de Barros (until 17 July); vacant (starting 17 July)
 Amapá: Antônio Hildegardo Gomes de Alencar 
 Amazonas: Alfredo Pereira do Nascimento (until 17 July); vacant (starting 17 July)
 Bahia: César Borges 
 Ceará: Moroni Bing Torgan 
 Espírito Santo: José Renato Casagrande 
 Goiás: Naphtali Alves de Souza 
 Maranhão: José Reinaldo Carneiro Tavares 
 Mato Grosso: José Márcio Panoff de Lacerda 
 Mato Grosso do Sul: vacant 
 Minas Gerais: Walfrido Silvino dos Mares Guia Neto 
 Pará: Hélio Mota Gueiros Júnior 
 Paraíba: vacant
 Paraná: Emília de Sales Belinati 
 Pernambuco: Jorge José Gomes 
 Piauí: Osmar Antônio de Araújo 
 Rio de Janeiro: Luiz Paulo Correa da Rocha
 Rio Grande do Norte: Fernando Freire 
 Rio Grande do Sul: Vicente Joaquim Bogo 
 Rondônia: Aparício Carvalho de Moraes 
 Roraima: Airton Antonio Soligo 
 Santa Catarina: José Augusto Hülse 
 São Paulo: Geraldo Alckmin 
 Sergipe: José Carlos Machado 
 Tocantins: Raimundo Nonato Pires dos Santos

See also 
1997 in Brazilian football
1997 in Brazilian television

References 

 
1990s in Brazil
Years of the 20th century in Brazil
Brazil
Brazil